A by-election was held in the New South Wales state electoral district of Paddington-Waverley on 25 February 1961. The by-election was triggered by the death  of William Ferguson.

Dates

Result

William Ferguson died.

See also
Electoral results for the district of Paddington-Waverley
List of New South Wales state by-elections

References

New South Wales state by-elections
1961 elections in Australia
1960s in New South Wales
February 1961 events in Australia